The following is a list of Indy Racing League IndyCar Series drivers who attempted to qualify for one or more races but never succeeded.

See also
List of Champ Car drivers who never qualified for a race
List of American Championship Car Rookie of the Year Winners

References
CART World
ChampCarStats.com

 
Drivers
IndyCar Series drivers who never qualified for a race